The following is a timeline of the history of the city of Skopje, North Macedonia.

Prior to 20th century

 6th C. CE - Skopje Fortress built.
 518 CE - Earthquake.
 6th C. CE - Town rebuilt; called "Justiniana Prima."
 7th C. CE - Slavs in power.
 8th - 12th C. - ?!?
 12th C. - Old Bazaar operating.
 1282 - Serbs in power.
 1346
 Coronation of Stephen Uroš IV Dušan as Emperor of the Serbs.
 Town becomes capital of the Serbian Empire.
 Marko's Monastery established near town.
 1366 - Serbian Vukašin Mrnjavčević in power.
 1391 - Ottomans in power; town renamed "Üsküp" and becomes capital of the Ottoman Sanjak of Üsküb.
 1392 - Pasha Yigit-Beg becomes governor of the Sanjak of Üsküb.
 1415 - Ishak Bey becomes governor of the Sanjak of Üsküb.
 1436 - Sultan Murad Mosque built.
 1443 - Islamic library established.
 1454 - Isa-Beg Isaković becomes governor of the Sanjak of Üsküb.
 1465 - Madrasa of Ishak Beg established.
 1467 - Kapan Han (caravanserai) active (approximate date).
 1469 - Stone Bridge built.
 1476 - Mosque of Isa Bey built.
 1485 - Kodja Mustafa mosque built.
 1492 - Mustafa Pasha Mosque built in the bazaar.
 1495 - Karlozade mosque built.
 1503 - Mosque of Yahya Pasha built.
 1519 - Aladja Mosque built.
 1555 - 1555 Skopje earthquake
 1569 - Population: 10,525.
 1572 - Political unrest.
 1584 - Political unrest.
 1595 - Political unrest.
 1661 - Traveller Evliya Çelebi visits town.
 1689 - October: Fire of Skopje 1689.
 1803 - Mosque of Murat Pasha built.
 1868 - Town becomes part of the Ottoman Prizren Vilayet.
 1873 - Thessaloniki–Skopje railway begins operating.
 1875 - Seat of the Prizren Vilayet relocated to Uskub from Pristina.
 1877 - Town becomes part of the Ottoman Kosovo Vilayet.
 1882 - Population: 34,152.
 1888 - Belgrad-Nish-Skoplye railway begins operating.

20th century

 1905 - Population: about 32,000.
 1912
 August: Albanians in power.
 Spiro Hadzhi Ristic becomes mayor.
 1913 - Serbs in power per Treaty of London.
 1918 - Town becomes part of Kingdom of Serbs, Croats and Slovenes.
 1921 - Population: 32,249.
 1926 - Skopje Zoo opens.
 1928 - Skopje International Airport opens
 1929 - Josif Mihajlović becomes mayor.
 1931 - Population: 64,807.
 1936 - Freedom Bridge built.
 1941
 April: City taken by German forces.
 Spiro Kitinchev becomes mayor.
 1944
 November 13 - Bulgarian Army captured the city, ejecting the Germans.
 Nova Makedonija newspaper begins publication.
 Public hospital established.
 Lazar Tanev becomes mayor.
 1945 - City becomes capital of the Socialist Republic of Macedonia of Yugoslavia.
 1946
 Saints Cyril and Methodius University of Skopje established.
 Association of Journalists of Macedonia headquartered in city.
 1947 - City Stadium of Skopje opens.
 1949
 City becomes capital of Skoplje Oblast.
 Museum of the City of Skopje founded in a former railway station.
 Ss. Cyril and Methodius University of Skopje founded.
 1953 - Population: 121,551.
 1963
 26 July: 1963 Skopje earthquake.
 Revolution Bridge built.
 Contemporary Art Museum of Macedonia founded.
 1967 - Macedonian Academy of Sciences and Arts headquartered in city.
 1974 - Metodi Antonov becomes mayor.
 1976 - City administration organized into five municipalities: Čair, Centar, Gazi Baba, Karpoš, and Kisela Voda.
 1977 - Cathedral of the Sacred Heart of Jesus founded.
 1978 - Tumba Madžari archaeological excavations begin.
 1981
 Transportation Center Skopje rebuilding completed.
 Population: 408,143.
 1984 - Macedonian Radio-Television Center built.
 1986 - Jugoslav Todorovski becomes mayor.
 1990 - Church of St. Clement of Ohrid consecrated.
 1991 - Milan Talevski becomes mayor.
 1992 - July: Political demonstration.
 1993
 City becomes capital of the Republic of Macedonia.
 Library of Islamic Culture built.
 United States Army Camp Able Sentry established near city.
 1995 - Macedonian Stock Exchange established.
 1996
 City administration organized into seven municipalities: Čair, Centar, Gazi Baba, Gjorče Petrov, Karpoš, Kisela Voda, Šuto Orizari.
 Yahya Kemal College established.
 Risto Penov becomes mayor.
 1997 - Center for Strategic Research and Documentation founded.
 1998 - Albanian demonstration.
 1999 - Euro-Balkan Institute headquartered in city.

21st century

 2001
 May: Political unrest.
 June: Anti-NATO demonstration.
 July: Anti-NATO demonstration.
 August: Protest against Ohrid Agreement.
 2002
 May: Labour unrest.
 Population: 506,926; metro 668,518.
 2004
 City administration organized into ten municipalities: Aerodrom, Butel, Čair, Centar, Gazi Baba, Ǵorče Petrov, Karpoš, Kisela Voda, Saraj, Šuto Orizari.
 Press to Exit project space established.
 2005
 Dance Fest Skopje begins.
 Trifun Kostovski becomes mayor.
 2009
 Memorial House of Mother Teresa opens.
 Koce Trajanovski becomes mayor.
 2010 - Skopje 2014 construction project announced.
 2011
 Skopje Airport new terminal and Museum of the Macedonian Struggle open.
 Millennium Cross Cable Car begins operating.
 Statue of Alexander the Great unveiled in Macedonia Square.
 Cevahir Towers construction begins.
 2012 - March: Ethnic unrest.
 2013
 March: Ethnic unrest.
 Air pollution in Skopje reaches annual mean of 45 PM2.5 and 74 PM10, more than recommended.
 2014 - Skopje 2014 extensive re-building project.
 2016
 2016 Macedonian protests.
 2016 Macedonian floods

See also
 History of Skopje
 List of mayors of Skopje

Notes

References

This article incorporates information from the French Wikipedia and Macedonian Wikipedia.

Bibliography

External links

 Europeana. Items related to Skopje, various dates.

 
Skopje
Skopje
Years in North Macedonia
History of Macedonia (region)
Skopje